Carceri is a Dutch death metal band from Delft, Netherlands, formed in 2000. The band comprises vocalist Kees de Vlieger, guitarist Ivar Useinov and Yoram Danneleit, bassist Rogier van Kleef and drummer Josha Nuis. Carceri released a debut album, The Good Must Suffer The Wicked, in 2011 via Armada Productions. In 2012 the band played at Neurotic Deathfest and toured as opening act on the Reborn of Death 2012 tour with Suffocation, Blood Red Throne, Cattle Decapitation Sadist and Cerebral Bore in the UK, Ireland and France.

History
Carceri formed in 2000 in Delft, Netherlands. In 2003, the band released a self-titled demo containing 5 tracks recorded at Excess Studio's in Rotterdam.

Musical style

Metalrage.com commented, of the band's debut album, "Carceri started with playing death metal in the nineties, recorded one demo and finally released their first album in 2011. What you get is top notch technical death metal, the brutal way. Without triggers the band gives us eight songs that are full of creativity, awesome metal solos and brutal blast beats."

Members
Kees de Vlieger – vocals (1999–present)
Ivar Useinov – guitars (1999–present)
Yoram Danneleit – guitars (2012–present)
Rogier van Kleef – bass guitar (1999–present)
Josha Nuis – drums (1999–present)

Past members
Vincent de Corte – guitars (1999–2012)

Discography
The Good Must Suffer The Wicked (2011)

References

External links

Dutch death metal musical groups
Musical groups established in 1999
Musical quintets
1999 establishments in the Netherlands